Shochat is a surname. Notable people with the surname include:

Avraham Shochat (born 1936), Israeli politician
Israel Shochat (1886–1962), Russian-born Zionist militia leader
Manya Shochat (1880–1961), Russian-born Israeli pioneer
Tal Shochat (born 1974), Israeli photographer